Dibben is a surname. Notable people with the surname include:

 David Dibben (born 1958), Caymanian cyclist
 Jonathan Dibben (born 1994), British cyclist
 Peter Dibben (born 1991), British track cyclist